Bridport railway station formerly served the town of Bridport in the English county of Dorset. The station was on the Maiden Newton-Bridport branch line; the station (and branch line) opened in 1857 and was closed by British Rail in 1975.

History
Opened with the branch line on 12 November 1857 it was renamed Bridport (Bradpole Road) when the West Bay extension opened, to distinguish it from East Street and West Bay stations. In 1902, it was renamed Bridport. Consisting of two platforms, a small goods yard and an engine shed, it had a signal box.

Operated by the Great Western Railway, it was placed in the Western Region when the railways were nationalised in 1948. From 1950 until 1962, the line was administered as part of the Southern Region, with Bridport station acquiring the then-standard Southern Region green signage - some of which remained until the closure of the station. In 1963, the administration of the line was transferred back to the Western Region.

After the withdrawal of the West Bay passenger trains in 1930 the station became the passenger terminus of the line. The goods service to West Bay was withdrawn in 1962, leading to the lifting of the track south of Bridport station. In its final years, the line was usually operated by a British Rail Class 121 single car diesel multiple unit. The track at Bridport station was consequently rationalised, with all sidings removed and just a single track remaining serving one platform. The once well-kept Bridport station became unstaffed in 1969 and subsequently appeared increasingly dilapidated.

The branch line was threatened with closure in the Beeching report. Narrow roads in the area, unsuitable for buses, prevented a closure in the 1960s. Bridport station (along with the branch line from Maiden Newton) was eventually closed on 5 May 1975 - the penultimate closure directly linked to the Beeching cuts (prior to the closure of the Alston branch line in Cumbria in 1976).

The site today
Bridport station buildings were demolished in 1977 and the site cleared. The location of the former station and all its sidings and goods facilities have now been converted into an industrial estate containing two supermarkets and a builders merchants.

References

Further reading 
   ISBN(no ISBN)

External links
 Bridport station on navigable 1946 O. S. map
 Bridport Trailway
 Disused stations website: Bridport

Disused railway stations in Dorset
Former Great Western Railway stations
Railway stations in Great Britain opened in 1857
Railway stations in Great Britain closed in 1975
Bridport
1857 establishments in England
1975 disestablishments in England
Beeching closures in England